Lucas Pedro Alves de Lima (born 10 October 1991), known as Lucas Lima, is a Brazilian professional footballer who plays as a left-back for İstanbul Başakşehir.

Club career
Lucas Lima made his senior debut for Criciúma in the Série C in a match against Marília at the Estádio Heriberto Hülse on 24 May 2009. Later that year, Lima was signed by Internacional. In 2011, he was sent on loan to Série B side Paraná where he spent his first senior season. After not being able to establish himself at Internacional, and making only two first-team appearances, he moved on to Botafogo. Lima was part of the squad that won the Campeonato Carioca in 2013 and qualified Botafogo for the 2014 Copa Libertadores after 18 years absent of the tournament.

On 24 January 2014, Goiás signed Lima on a season-long loan deal. In early 2015, he rescinded his contract due to unpaid wages, and signed a one-year deal with ABC.

On 16 June 2015, Arouca announced they had agreed a deal with Lima signing a two-year contract.

Honours

Club
Internacional
Campeonato Gaúcho: 2012

Botafogo
Campeonato Carioca: 2013

References

External links

1991 births
Living people
Brazilian footballers
Association football defenders
Campeonato Brasileiro Série A players
Campeonato Brasileiro Série B players
Campeonato Brasileiro Série C players
Primeira Liga players
Ligue 1 players
Saudi Professional League players
Süper Lig players
Criciúma Esporte Clube players
Sport Club Internacional players
Paraná Clube players
Botafogo de Futebol e Regatas players
Goiás Esporte Clube players
ABC Futebol Clube players
F.C. Arouca players
FC Nantes players
Al-Ahli Saudi FC players
İstanbul Başakşehir F.K. players
Brazilian expatriate footballers
Brazilian expatriate sportspeople in Portugal
Brazilian expatriate sportspeople in France
Brazilian expatriate sportspeople in Saudi Arabia
Brazilian expatriate sportspeople in Turkey
Expatriate footballers in Portugal
Expatriate footballers in France
Expatriate footballers in Saudi Arabia
Expatriate footballers in Turkey